Fermi Nuclear Power Plant may refer to:
 Enrico Fermi Nuclear Generating Station, an operating nuclear power plant in Michigan
 Enrico Fermi Nuclear Power Plant (Italy), a now closed nuclear power plant in Italy